MS Stena Baltica is a RoPax ferry, owned by Stena Line and operates on the Baltic Sea between Nynäshamn, Sweden and Ventspils, Latvia. The ship previously operated on the Irish Sea, between Birkenhead and Belfast, as Stena Mersey.

The ship was built in Italy by Cantiere Navale Visentini and launched in 2005. As built, the vessel measured  and could carry up to 980 passengers. The on-board cabins had space to sleep 480 passengers. There are four vehicle decks with a capacity for approximately 200 trailers.

History

Stena Baltica was launched in December 2005 as Mersey Viking, entering service with Norse Merchant Ferries later the same month. A few months later, Norse Merchant Ferries was acquired by Norfolkline. Mersey Viking received Norfolkline lettering on her red hull but retained her Norse Merchant Ferries funnel for several years.

In July 2010 Norfolkline was acquired by DFDS. The vessel was renamed Mersey Seaways during her refit in August 2010. Later that same year, DFDS sold its Northern Irish operations to Stena Line.  In August 2011, the vessel was renamed Stena Mersey

Early in 2012, Stena Mersey, along with her sister ship , was given a complete interior and exterior refit and repaint at Harland and Wolff.

Stena Mersey is due to undergo lengthening at the Sedef Shipyard in Tuzla, Istanbul, with the inclusion of a  midsection, renamed as Stena Baltica and then re-entering service. Stena Baltica is planned to operate on the Baltic Sea between Nynäshamn and Ventspils.

Route
Stena Mersey operated on the Birkenhead–Belfast route with her marginally older sister ship Stena Lagan. The total journey time on board the ship was 8 hours.

On board
Stena Mersey carried a maximum of 720 passengers.

References

External links

 Stena Line website 
 DFDS Seaways website
 Norfolkline website
 Faktaom Fartyg
 Ferry-site

Ferries of the United Kingdom
Ferries of Northern Ireland
Ferries of England
2005 ships
Baltica (2005)
Ships built by Cantiere Navale Visentini
Ships built in Italy
Transport in Merseyside